Two regiments of the British Army have been numbered the 111th Regiment of Foot:

111th Regiment of Foot (1761), raised in 1761
111th Regiment of Foot (Loyal Birmingham Volunteers), raised in 1794